Angelica Aposteanu (later Chertic, born 21 August 1954) is a retired Romanian rower. She won three bronze medals in three different events at the 1974 and 1975 world championships and 1980 Olympics.

References

External links 
 
 
 

1954 births
Living people
Romanian female rowers
Olympic rowers of Romania
Rowers at the 1980 Summer Olympics
Olympic bronze medalists for Romania
Olympic medalists in rowing
Medalists at the 1980 Summer Olympics
World Rowing Championships medalists for Romania
20th-century Romanian women